New Barrackpur railway station is a Kolkata Suburban Railway station in North 24 Parganas district, West Bengal, India. Its code is NBE. It serves New Barrackpur areas. The station consists of two platforms. The platforms are not well sheltered. It has many facilities including water and sanitation. There is a proper approach road to this railway station.

New Barrackpur is located on Sealdah–Hasnabad–Bangaon–Ranaghat line of Kolkata Suburban Railway. Link between Dum Dum to Khulna now in Bangladesh, via Bangaon was constructed by Bengal Central Railway Company in 1882–84. The Sealah–Dum Dum–Barasat–Ashok Nagar–Bangaon sector was electrified in 1963–64.

See also

References

External links
New Barrackpore railway station map
 

Sealdah railway division
Railway stations in North 24 Parganas district
Transport in Kolkata
Kolkata Suburban Railway stations